Yoshikazu Yokoshima (born 10 March 1952) is a Japanese professional golfer.

Yokoshima played on the Japan Golf Tour, winning six times.

Professional wins (6)

Japan Golf Tour wins (6)

*Note: The 1987 Kanto Open was shortened to 54 holes due to rain.

External links

Japanese male golfers
Japan Golf Tour golfers
Sportspeople from Chiba Prefecture
1952 births
Living people